Candlewick (which can also translate to 'Lampwick') is a fictional character who appears in Carlo Collodi's 1883 book The Adventures of Pinocchio (Le avventure di Pinocchio).

Role

Candlewick is introduced in chapter 30 of The Adventures of Pinocchio. His real name is Romeo, though he is given his nickname on account of his slender, polished build. He is described as the most unruly of Pinocchio's class, though he is the puppet’s best friend. He declines Pinocchio’s invitation to a party celebrating his upcoming transformation into a real boy, and persuades the puppet to instead come with him to the Land of Toys (Paese dei Balocchi), a place where the boys spend their days having fun, and eating candy, where education, responsibility and nutrition simply aren't a thing.

The two are transported to the Land of Toys by the Coachman, and spend their days indulging in play and idleness. After five months, both of them awake with donkey ears, which they conceal with tall caps. The two are reluctant to admit their condition to each other, but after some coaxing, they simultaneously remove their caps and laugh at each other. Their laughter fades into braying and the two of them gain muzzles, hooves, tails on their buttocks, hind and fore legs, fur, and manes, and they transform into a pair of donkeys.

While Pinocchio is sold to a circus ringleader, Candlewick is sold to a farmer who makes him work at a water mill. In a later chapter, Pinocchio is sold to a drummer who attempts to drown the donkey in order to skin his hide and use it to make his drum. The man is then surprised that instead of finding a dead donkey, he sees Pinocchio who says the fish ate away at all his donkey skin.

Pinocchio and Candlewick meet again in the last chapter, where it is revealed that Candlewick is dying from exhaustion. Pinocchio, now returned to normal, temporarily takes on Candlewick's job of doing farm work, and is laughed at when he reveals to Candlewick's owner that he went to school with the animal. Candlewick dies from exhaustion not long after.

Adaptations

The first Lucignolo (Candlewick) in cinema history was the French-Italian comedian Natalino Guillaume in Pinocchio (1911) directed by Giulio Antamoro, in a cast of adult actors, in which the character of Pinocchio was played by his brother Ferdinand Guillaume (Polidor).

Candlewick then appeared in Walt Disney's 1940 animated adaptation, Pinocchio, with the name Lampwick, animated as a self-caricature by Fred Moore and voiced by Frankie Darro. He meets Pinocchio on the way to Pleasure Island and becomes friends with him when the two engage in bad behavior, though less than the rest of the children, which slows the curse turning them into donkeys. While playing pool and smoking cigars, they are accosted by Jiminy Cricket, who scolds Pinocchio and tries to get him to leave with him, but Lampwick bullies and ridicules Jiminy to the point that he leaves furiously. The curse eventually catches up with both boys, and Lampwick is the first to turn into a donkey. Before he completely loses his humanity, he screams out for his mother. Pinocchio and Jiminy flee the island before the curse takes hold, leaving Lampwick's fate unknown.

The first child actor to play the role of Lampwick was Guglielmo Selvaggio in The Adventures of Pinocchio directed by Giannetto Guardone in 1947.

Lampwick appears in a 1972 Italian animated adaptation titled The Adventures of Pinocchio. He is portrayed like the original story: a lazy boy who dislikes school and is Pinocchio's closest friend there. As in the novel, he convinces Pinocchio to come to the Land of Toys with him, where they play many games and eat junk food and go on amusement rides. Eventually he and Pinocchio transform into donkeys and are sold to a farmer and a circus. Near the end of the film, after Pinocchio starts to work at the farm, he finds Lampwick heavily wounded and exhausted from overwork at the farm, the donkey then shortly dies. The character is voiced by Italian actress Flaminia Jandolo.

In the 1972 television miniseries The Adventures of Pinocchio, director Luigi Comencini entrusted the part to Domenico Santoro, a kid he had "discovered" while shooting a documentary on child labor in Naples (I bambini e noi, 1970).

In the 1976 made-for-TV musical Pinocchio starring Sandy Duncan in the title role and Danny Kaye as Geppetto, Candlewick is portrayed by Gary Morgan.

In the 1993 direct-to-video adaptation by GoodTimes Entertainment, where the character is voiced by Cam Clarke (who also voiced Flounder from "The Little Mermaid: Ariel's Beginning"), Candlewick is portrayed like his Disney counterpart, Lampwick, with red hair (though he does not have buckteeth) who tries to have fun in Dunceland with Pinocchio. Like his Disney counterpart, he is transformed into a donkey and his fate is unknown.

Lampwick appears in the 1996 film The Adventures of Pinocchio, portrayed by Corey Carrier as a boy whom Pinocchio meets at school and later convinces him to come with him to Terra Magica, where they are allowed to do whatever they please. Eventually, they and two other boys (one of which is Lampwick's best friend Saleo) ride a roller coaster. During the ride, they are splashed with enchanted water which turns them into animals based on their nature. Lampwick, Saleo, and many of the other bad boys turn into donkeys, while Pinocchio only grows donkey ears. They are later corralled by Lorenzini, who fulfills the roles of both the Puppeteer and the Coachman. Pinocchio escapes and sets the other boys free. During their escape, the donkey Lampwick kicks Lorenzini into the spring filled with the enchanted water which turns him into a whale. Close to the end of the movie, the donkey Lampwick is seen pulling Geppetto, Pinocchio and Leona on a carriage alongside the donkey Saleo. Lampwick, along with Saleo and the other donkeys, eventually returns to human form by doing good deeds. He can be seen playing with the human Pinocchio before the end credits. Unlike in the novel and the 1940 Disney version, Lampwick remains Pinocchio's best friend as a result of returning human, and affectionately calls him "Woody" even after he himself becomes a real boy.

Lampwick appears in the 2002 feature film Pinocchio portrayed by Kim Rossi Stuart while his English dub voice was provided by Topher Grace. In the English version, he is named Leonardo. He first meets Pinocchio in prison after Pinocchio was cheated by the Fox and the Cat, teaching him what lollipop he licks, which is tangerine, and then they meet again after Pinocchio is kidnapped by a farmer in order to replace a dog that died. During that time, Lampwick attempts to steal chickens. Later, he entices Pinocchio to join him at the Land of Toys, where bad boys turn into donkeys. He turns into a donkey and is sold to a farmer. When Pinocchio goes to work for the same farmer after he and Geppetto escape from the Giant Shark, he finds Lampwick's donkey form dying from exhaustion.

Lampwick appears in the 2008 Pinocchio miniseries, played by Thomas Sangster. The miniseries is more faithful to the book; Lampwick has a much bigger role than in the Disney film, and he dies toward the end. This also develops him somewhat more, as it implies (though fans of the book or various film versions may have analyzed him this way anyway) that his lawlessness and cynicism comes from having a horrible father, as he tells Pinocchio before he dies that if he had had a father like Geppetto, he may have turned out more like Pinocchio, and his loyalty to Pinocchio is very apparent too, although most versions do imply their bond is quite strong.

Lampwick appears in the 2012 Italian animated film Pinocchio, voiced by Paolo Ruffini in the Italian and Noah Bernett in the English dub while also being renamed to Wickley. Like in the 1940 Disney version, his fate is left unknown after he is turned into a donkey.

In the 2013 American animated web series RWBY one of the main antagonists, Roman Torchwick, alludes to Candlewick. The character's appearance is also based on the Disney version of the character, Lampwick, as they both have no respect for the law.

In the live-action Italian film Pinocchio (2019), co-written, directed and co-produced by Matteo Garrone, Lucignolo (who keeps his Italian name in the English version) is portrayed by Alessio Di Domenicantonio, while his English dub voice is provided by Vittorio Thermes. Like in the 1940 Disney version and the 2012 animated movie, his fate is left unknown after he is turned into a donkey.

In the 2022 live-action Disney remake, Lampwick is portrayed by Lewin Lloyd.

In the stop-motion animated Netflix film, Pinocchio, Candlewick is voiced by Finn Wolfhard. This version takes place in Fascist Italy. Candlewick is presented as the son of a village’s strict Podestà, who is the film's counterpart to The Coachman. In this version, Candlewick is desperate to please his father by being the perfect Italian model soldier. He is afraid of disappointing his father, who perceives him as weak, giving him the cruel nickname "Candlewick" because he is small and scrawny. When Candlewick first meets Pinocchio, he bullies him, while his father, who is initially skeptical of the puppet, quickly begins to view him as the perfect soldier upon the discovery that he cannot die. Later, Candlewick is brought to a training camp, along with Pinocchio, by the Podestà, who runs the camp. Candlewick and Pinocchio strike up a friendship and share their feelings with each other. After a training game of capture the flag ends in a draw, the Podestà orders Candlewick to shoot Pinocchio dead, to prove his worth as a soldier. At that moment, the camp is bombed by Allied aircraft. Inspired by his friendship with Pinocchio, Candlewick finally stands up to his father, saying that he’ll never be the son he wanted him to be. The Podestà is infuriated by Candlewick's insubordination, but becomes entangled in netting, and is killed by a bomb. After the camp is destroyed, Candlewick, who survives the attack, goes in search of Pinocchio. His ultimate fate is left unresolved at the end of the film.

Disney 
Candlewick appears in Walt Disney's 1940 animated adaptation of Pinocchio. He is given the alternate translation of his name, Lampwick, and is voiced by Frankie Darro as a human and Clarence Nash in his donkey form. His likeness is modeled after Disney animator Fred Moore, and like his literary version, he is tall and slender and sports red hair and buck teeth.

In the film, Lampwick befriends Pinocchio during the journey to Pleasure Island and leads Pinocchio astray by introducing him to such activities as fighting others, smoking and drinking beer. Jiminy Cricket finds Pinocchio playing pool with Lampwick and the latter bullies him calling Jiminy a "grasshopper" and "beetle", laughing at him after Jiminy threatens to fight him. Shortly after this altercation, Jiminy notices that the boys on Pleasure Island are literally turning into jackasses and being rounded up for slave labor. Lampwick's transformation is swift: within a minute, he loses all humanity (including his red hair and buckteeth) and is last seen wrecking the pool hall in panic. Lampwick began transforming before Pinocchio because he was one of the worst-behaved boys on the island. It is unknown what happens to him afterwards, but it can be presumed that he was captured and sold into slave labor after he was left behind by Pinocchio.

Lampwick also makes a cameo in House of Mouse, as well as in Who Framed Roger Rabbit where he appears on a poster advertising for "exploding cigars" in Toontown, with his donkey ears from the original film. In live performance, Lampwick has often starred in Disneyland's Electrical Parade along with an unnamed boy from Pleasure Island, where Lampwick and the other boys have tails and donkey ears and wave to guests at Disneyland.

Lampwick appears in the 2022 live-action remake, where he is portrayed by Lewin Lloyd.  In January 2021, Oakes Fegley had entered early negotiations to play the role.

References

Bibliography
Collodi, Le Avventure di Pinocchio 1883, Biblioteca Universale Rizzoli

Pinocchio characters
Fictional donkeys
Fictional Italian people in literature
Literary characters introduced in 1883
Child characters in literature
Male characters in literature
Male characters in animation